This is a list of newspapers in Tanzania.

List of newspapers

See also
 Media of Tanzania
 List of radio stations in Africa: Tanzania
 Telecommunications in Tanzania

References

Bibliography
 
  
 
  (About a newspaper in Moshi)

External links
 
 

 
Tanzania
Newspapers